Bretz is a surname. Notable people with the surname include:

 Eleonora Bretz, Luxembourgian-Greek female model
 George Bretz (1880–1956), Canadian lacrosse player
 George Bretz (photographer), American photographer
 Greg Bretz (born 1990), American snowboarder
 J Harlen Bretz (1882 - 1981), American geologist, first to recognize evidence of the Missoula Floods, also known as the Bretz Floods 
 Jim Bretz (born 1964), American baseball coach and scout
 John L. Bretz (1852 - 1920), U.S. Representative from Indiana